Giavazzi is an Italian surname. Notable people with the surname include:

 Francesco Giavazzi (born 1949), Italian economist
 Giovanni Giavazzi (1920–2019), Italian politician
 Stefano Giavazzi (born 1963), Italian pianist

Italian-language surnames